U-50 may refer to one of the following German submarines:

 , a Type U 43 submarine launched in 1915 and that served in the First World War until sunk on or after 31 August 1917
 During the First World War, Germany also had these submarines with similar names:
 , a Type UB III submarine launched in 1917 and surrendered 16 January 1919; broken up at Swansea in 1922
 , a Type UC II submarine launched in 1916 and sunk 4 February 1918
 , a Type VIIB submarine that served in the Second World War until sunk on 6 April 1940

U50 may also refer to the General Electric U50, a class of diesel electric locomotive.

Submarines of Germany